Södersvik is a locality situated in Norrtälje Municipality, Stockholm County, Sweden with 281 inhabitants in 2010.

References 

Populated places in Norrtälje Municipality